, also known as Necromancy, is a 1957 Japanese horror film directed by Katsuhiko Tasaka. It stars Shintaro Katsu and Takako Irie, the latter known for her roles in "ghost cat" films (kaibyō eiga or bake neko mono), with her appearance in Ghost Cat of Yonaki Swamp being her fifth and final such role.

References

Further reading

External links
 

Japanese horror films
1957 films
1957 horror films
Films set in Japan
1950s Japanese films